Yelet Giorgis Church is an Ethiopian Orthodox church in Yelet, Bulga, Ethiopia.

The church is dedicated to Saint George, and has over 2,500 parishioners. The church body has been in existence since the 17th century.

The first edifice, a traditional circular thatch roof church, burnt down in 1950. A modern, iron roof church was built in its place by Dejazmach Kidane Woldemedhin and dedicated in 1956. This building was erected on the same church site and served its community for a further 51 years until a more modern, 8-sided stone building was built in its place during the years 2004–2007. The new church was dedicated on 23rd Tikmt 2000 (Ethiopian calendar), which corresponds to 3 November 2007 in the Gregorian calendar.

See also
 Saint George: Devotions, traditions and prayers
 Yemrehana Krestos Church

External links
 http://www.nai.uu.se/library/resources/dossiers/local_history_of_ethiopia/xyz/ORTYEK.pdf

Churches completed in 2007
Oriental Orthodox congregations established in the 17th century
Ethiopian Orthodox Tewahedo church buildings
Octagonal churches in Ethiopia
21st-century Oriental Orthodox church buildings
21st-century churches in Ethiopia